Angel of Light is the fifth studio album by British heavy metal band Angel Witch. "The Night Is Calling" and "Don't Turn Your Back" represent the first official recording of two songs the band played live in the 80s, and which were previously available on bootlegs. 'The Night Is Calling' has also been covered by pre-Candlemass band Nemesis. An official music video was made for "Death from Andromeda". The album was released digitally, as a digipack CD, by itself or in a bundle with merch, and in vinyl. A limited edition Vinyl / CD Boxset limited to 1000 copies was also released which contained: A Red/white/black marbled vinyl, the digipack CD, and 7" containing re-recorded versions of "Frontal Assault' & 'Straight from Hell"; As well as a Baphomet flag, Angel of Light backpatch and art print.

Reception 

A review on Sonic Perspectives considered it a perfect followup to 2012s As Above, So Below, stating how "Angel Witch returns with an album chock full of riffs and doomy atmosphere to please even the most avid fan of the band." And that it feels more like a direct follow-up to their 80s Angel Witch than anything else.

Track listing

Personnel
Angel Witch
Kevin Heybourne - lead guitar, vocals
Jimmy Martin - rhythm guitar, electronics (track 2)
Will Palmer - bass
Fredrik Jansson-Punkka - drums

Session members
James Atkinson - organ (track 8), backing vocals

Production
James Atkinson - producer, engineering, mixing, lyrics (tracks 2, 3, 7)
Terry Waker - mastering
Adam Burke - cover art
Branca Studio - layout
Ester Segarra - photography
Jimmy Martin - lyrics (track 1)
Will Palmer - lyrics (tracks 1, 2, 7)
S. Heath - lyrics (track 4)

References 

2019 albums
Angel Witch albums